Sky Point & Vivane is a 1995 role-playing game supplement for Earthdawn published by FASA.

Contents
Sky Point & Vivane is the third boxed Campaign Set for Earthdawn and details the city of Viviane, the nearby military base of Sky Point and the surrounding area of Vivane Province, and it contains new information on the Theran Empire and the lands it controls.

Reception
Andy Butcher reviewed Sky Point & Vivane for Arcane magazine, rating it an 8 out of 10 overall. Butcher comments that "Sky Point & Vivane is a great supplement. The central conflict makes the place hugely interesting, and it's packed full of enough information and ideas to provide a solid base for a whole campaign."

Reviews
Dragon #225 (Jan., 1996)

References

Earthdawn supplements
Role-playing game supplements introduced in 1995